The following artists (musicians or bands) have had releases with EMI Records (formerly Virgin EMI Records). This list is not for artists who have recorded solely under the Virgin Records label or the original EMI Records label that existed from 1973 to 2012.

0-9
 2 Chainz
 6ix9ine

A
 Ai
 Alessia Cara
 Aidan Bissett
 Alesso
 Alice Chater
 Alice Glass
 Alison Wonderland
 Amber Mark
 Aminé
 Amy Macdonald
 Anthonia Edwards
 Anthony Ramos
 Arlissa
 Astrid S
 Avenged Sevenfold

B
 Banks
 Barns Courtney
 Bastille
 Beck
 Benny Blanco
 Berhana
 Beth Ditto
 Bishop Briggs
 Black Sabbath
 Blossoms
 Bree Runway

C
 Calum Scott
 Carrie Underwood
 Chantel Jeffries
 Chase & Status
 CHVRCHES
 Cold War Kids

D
 Dave East
 David Zowie
 Desiigner
 Devo (UK/Europe only)
 Dolapo
 Donna Missal
 Duke Dumont

E
 Eden
 Elkie Brooks
 Elton John
 Emeli Sandé
 Empire of the Sun
 Etham

F
 Fall Out Boy
 Fangclub
 Fletcher
 Florence and the Machine
 Four of Diamonds

G
 George Michael
 Gorgon City
 Greta Van Fleet

H
 Halsey
 Hardwell
 Hardy Caprio
 Hayden James
 Hey Violet
 HRVY

I
 Incubus
 Isaac Gracie

J
 James Bay
 Jamie T
 Jamiroquai
 Jasmin Walia
 Jay Pryor
 Jessie Ware
 Jon Bellion
 Jonas Blue
 Justin Bieber

K
 Kali Uchis
 Karol G
 Katy Perry
 Kawala
 Keith Richards
 Kid Creme
 Konirata
 Krept & Konan
 KT Tunstall

L
 Lancey Foux
 Lethal Bizzle
 Lewis Capaldi
 Lil Yachty
 Logic
 Loyle Carner

M
 Mabel (singer)
 Mae Stephens
 Maejor
 Marika Hackman
 Mark Knopfler
 Martin Solveig
 Massive Attack
 Maty Noyes
 Max Drazen
 Metallica
 Migos
 MIKA
 Mike Oldfield
 Misterwives
 MNEK
 Mori Calliope
 MoStack

N
 Naughty Boy
 New Hope Club
 Niall Horan

O
 Offaiah
 Olivia O'Brien
 Olly Murs
 Only The Poets

P
 Paul Heaton & Jacqui Abbott
 Pearl Jam
 Peter Gabriel
 Pretty Vicious
 Pusha T

Q
 Queen (excluding United States and Canada)
 Queen Naija

R
Rise Against
 Ryan Adams
 Ryan Beatty

S
 Sam Smith
 Sandro Cavazza
 Sagarika Mukherjee Da Costa
 Seeb
 Seinabo Sey
 SG Lewis
 Shaan
 Shania Twain
 Shawn Mendes
 Sneakbo
 Steve Perry
 Sub Focus
 Swedish House Mafia

T
 Taylor Swift
 The Beaches
 The Chemical Brothers
 The Killers
 The Preatures
 The Pretty Reckless
 The Stone Roses
 The Vamps
 Thirdstory
 Thunderpussy
 Tion Wayne
 Timi Dakolo
 Tory Lanez
 Trap Beckham
 Trippie Redd

U
 UB40

V
 Vera Blue
 Vic Mensa
 Vince Staples

W
 Wes Nelson
 Westlife
 Wilkinson

Y
YG

Z
Zuzu

References

External links 
 Virgin EMI Records artist page

Lists of recording artists by label